Nathan Roscoe Pound (October 27, 1870 – June 30, 1964) was an American legal scholar and educator. He served as dean of the University of Nebraska College of Law from 1903 to 1911 and was dean of Harvard Law School from 1916 to 1936. He was a member of Northwestern University, the University of Chicago Law School and the faculty at UCLA School of Law in the school's early years, from 1949 to 1952. The Journal of Legal Studies has identified Pound as one of the most cited legal scholars of the 20th century.

Early life and education
Pound was born in Lincoln, Nebraska to Stephen Bosworth Pound and Laura Pound. His sister was the noted linguist and folklorist, Louise Pound.

Pound studied botany at the University of Nebraska in Lincoln, where he became a member of the Chi Phi Fraternity. He received his bachelor's degree in 1888 and his master's degree in 1889. In 1889 he began the study of law; he spent one year at Harvard but never received a law degree. Following his year at Harvard, he returned to Nebraska where he passed the bar without a law degree. He received the first PhD in botany from the University of Nebraska in 1898. From 1899 to 1907 he taught law on the faculty of the University of Nebraska law school.

The University of Nebraska established its first football team the year after Pound graduated. Pound traveled with the teams to their games, including their first one. He also covered the team in the student newspaper and even refereed some games. Pound created many chants and songs for the team and helped create a fan base that traveled well, which is something that the Cornhuskers still see to this day.

Career
In 1903, Pound became dean of the University of Nebraska College of Law. In 1911 he began teaching at Harvard and in 1916 became dean of Harvard Law School and served in that role until 1937. He wrote "Spurious Interpretation" in 1907, Outlines of Lectures on Jurisprudence in 1914, The Spirit of the Common Law in 1921, Law and Morals in 1924, and Criminal Justice in America in 1930.

In 1908 he was part of the founding editorial staff of the first comparative law journal in the United States, the Annual Bulletin of the Comparative Law Bureau of the American Bar Association. In 1909, he taught at the University of Chicago Law School. Although it is not often remembered now, Pound was a Roman law scholar. He taught that subject at Nebraska, Northwestern and Harvard. Pound was sufficiently adept at Latin to translate Roman law into English for a sourcebook he used for those classes, and he was said by Professor Joseph Henry Beale to have "brought the spirit of Roman law to Harvard".<ref>The book is Readings in Roman Law and the Civil Law and Modern Codes as Developments Thereof (2nd ed., 1914). See Timothy G. Kearley, Roman Law, Classical Education, and Limits on Classical Participation in America into the Twentieth-Century 132-133 (2022).</ref> Pound was also the founder of the movement for "sociological jurisprudence", an influential critic of the U.S. Supreme Court's "liberty of contract" (freedom of contract) line of cases, symbolized by Lochner v. New York (1905), and one of the early leaders of the movement for American Legal Realism, which argued for a more pragmatic and public-interested interpretation of law and a focus on how the legal process actually occurred, as opposed to (in his view) the arid legal formalism which prevailed in American jurisprudence at the time. According to Pound, these jurisprudential movements advocated "the adjustment of principles and doctrines to the human conditions they are to govern rather than to assumed first principles". While Pound was dean, law school registration almost doubled, but his standards were so rigorous that one-third of those matriculated did not receive degrees. Among these were many of the great political innovators of the New Deal years.

In 1929 President Herbert Hoover appointed Pound as one of the eleven primary members of the Wickersham Commission on issues relating to law enforcement, criminal activity, police brutality, and Prohibition.

During Roosevelt's first term, Pound initially supported the New Deal. In 1937, however, Pound turned against the New Deal and the Legal Realism movement altogether after Roosevelt proposed packing the federal courts and bringing independent agencies into the executive branch. Other factors contributing to this "lurking conservatism" within Pound included bitter battles with liberals on the Harvard law faculty, the death of his wife, and a sharp exchange with Karl Llewellyn. Pound, however, had for years been an outspoken advocate of these court and administrative reforms that Roosevelt proposed and it was acknowledged that he only became conservative because he saw an opportunity to gain attention after his Harvard colleagues had turned on his ideas of government reform after Roosevelt had proposed them.

In 1937 Pound resigned as Dean of Harvard Law School to become a University Professor and soon became a leading critic of the legal realists. He proposed his ideas of government reform to Chinese leader Chiang Kai-shek. In 1934 Pound received an honorary degree from the University of Berlin, presented by the German ambassador to the United States. Pound was among the famous American jurists to express a liking for Adolf Hitler.

In the 1940s, Pound was apparently favourably disposed to replacing John P. Higgins as a judge on the International Military Tribunal for the Far East, which was conducting a war crimes trial in Tokyo, though an appointment did not eventuate. He joined the faculty of UCLA School of Law in 1949, the year the law school opened, and remained on the faculty until 1952.

Criminal justice in Cleveland
In 1922 Roscoe Pound and Felix Frankfurter undertook a detailed quantitative study of crime reporting in Cleveland newspapers for the month of January 1919, using column inch counts. They found that in the first half of the month, the total amount of space given over to crime was 925 in., but in the second half, it leapt to 6642 in. This was despite the fact that the number of crimes reported had increased only from 345 to 363. They concluded that although the city's much publicized "crime wave" was largely fictitious and manufactured by the press, the coverage had a very real consequence for the administration of criminal justice.

Because the public believed they were in the middle of a crime epidemic, they demanded an immediate response from the police and the city authorities. The agencies, wishing to retain public support, complied, caring "more to satisfy popular demand than to be observant of the tried process of law." The result was a greatly increased likelihood of miscarriages of justice and sentences more severe than the offenses warranted.

Contribution to jurisprudence
Roscoe Pound also made a significant contribution to jurisprudence in the tradition of sociological jurisprudence, which emphasized the importance of social relationships in the development of law and vice versa. His best-known theory consists of conceptualizing law as social engineering. According to Pound, a lawmaker acts as a social engineer by attempting to solve problems in society using law as a tool. Pound argued that laws must be understood by examining the "interests" that they serve. These "interests" might be individual interests, such as the protection of an individual's life or property, or broader social interests.

Personal life
In 1903, Pound co-founded the Society of Innocents, the preeminent senior honor society at Nebraska. Pound is also a member of the Nebraska Hall of Fame. He was a Freemason, and was a member and Past Master of Lancaster Lodge No. 54 AF & AM in Lincoln, Nebraska. He also served as Deputy Grand Master for the Grand Lodge of Massachusetts in 1915 and delivered a series of Masonic lectures for the Grand Lodge in March and April 1916. He helped to found The Harvard Lodge A.F. & A.M. along with Kirsopp Lake a Professor of the Divinity School, and others.

In 1946 Pound helped the 22-year-old Charlie Munger, later a successful businessman and investor, to get into Harvard Law school.

Notes

References
 
 Pound, Roscoe. American National Biography''. 17:760–763. 1999.

External links
 Roscoe Pound papers at Nebraska State Historical Society
 Justice According to Law (1914) essay
 The Spirit of the Common Law (1921) book based on Dartmouth Alumni Lectures
 
 
 www.law.harvard.edu/news/spotlight/classroom/related/hls-deans.html
 
 

1870 births
1964 deaths
Deans of Harvard Law School
Harvard Law School faculty
Writers from Lincoln, Nebraska
University of Nebraska–Lincoln alumni
American legal writers
Old Right (United States)
Northwestern University Pritzker School of Law faculty
Corresponding Fellows of the British Academy